The Yea River, an inland perennial river of the Goulburn Broken catchment, part of the Murray-Darling basin, is located in the lower South Eastern Highlands bioregion and Northern Country/North Central regions of the Australian state of Victoria.

Location and features

The river generally flows in a northerly direction, generally aligned with the Melba Highway which crosses the river in its lower reaches. The river is joined by six tributaries including the Murrindindi River, flows east and north of the town of  before reaching its confluence with the Goulburn River, near Ghin Ghin Bridge. The river descends  over its  course.

The river is also crossed by the Goulburn Valley Highway, east of Yea.

Etymology
The suspected Aboriginal Taungurung language name for the river is Kayigai, with no clearly defined meaning. A surveyor's map of  gives Kayigai or Muddy Creek, so it is likely that was the Aboriginal name of the river.

The river was called Muddy Creek in 1824 by explorers Hume and Hovell because of its muddy banks. The river was renamed when or soon after the town of Muddy Creek was renamed Yea. The river, like the town is named in honour of Colonel Lacy Walter Yea – a British Army colonel killed during the Crimean War in 1855, the year that Yea was founded.

See also

References

Goulburn Broken catchment
Rivers of Hume (region)
Tributaries of the Murray River
Tributaries of the Goulburn River